Aldayr Hernández Basanta (born 4 August 1995) is a Colombian professional footballer who plays as a defender for Honka.

Club career
In January 2021, he joined HIFK.

Career statistics

Club

Notes

References

1995 births
Living people
Colombian footballers
Colombian expatriate footballers
Colombia under-20 international footballers
Colombia youth international footballers
Association football defenders
Categoría Primera B players
Lebanese Premier League players
Ykkönen players
Veikkausliiga players
Rocha F.C. players
Bekaa SC players
Turun Palloseura footballers
HIFK Fotboll players
FC Honka players
Colombian expatriate sportspeople in Lebanon
Expatriate footballers in Lebanon
Colombian expatriate sportspeople in Uruguay
Expatriate footballers in Uruguay
Colombian expatriate sportspeople in Finland
Expatriate footballers in Finland
People from Bolívar Department